At , the Piekberg is the highest point on the island of Rügen and in the region of West Pomerania. It is also the fifth highest point in the German state of Mecklenburg-Vorpommern. It barely rises above the surrounding area, though, as the height difference is very low. The hill is located in a wooded area in the northwestern part of the Jasmund Peninsula, about 2 kilometres southwest of the Stubbenkammer in the Jasmund National Park and about 3 kilometres northeast of the town of Sassnitz. The state road (Landstraße) from Lohme to Sassnitz runs past the Piekberg to the east.

See also
 List of hills of Mecklenburg-Vorpommern

Hills of Mecklenburg-Western Pomerania
Geography of Rügen